Chiara Porro is an Australian diplomat who was appointed Ambassador to The Holy See in September 2020.

Porro was born in Milan but left Italy at age three. She graduated from the University of York, England with a Bachelor of Arts in politics, philosophy and economics. She subsequently completed a Master of Arts in international relations and diplomacy from Leiden University, Netherlands.

References 

 

Living people
Year of birth missing (living people)
Ambassadors of Australia to the Holy See
Australian women ambassadors
Alumni of the University of York
Leiden University alumni